Schwartziella fischeri is a species of minute sea snail, a marine gastropod mollusk or micromollusk in the family Zebinidae.

Distribution
This species occurs in the Caribbean Sea, the Gulf of Mexico and the Lesser Antilles.

Description 
The maximum recorded shell length is 4.5 mm.

Habitat 
Minimum recorded depth is 0 m. Maximum recorded depth is 55 m.

References

 Rosenberg, G., F. Moretzsohn, and E. F. García. 2009. Gastropoda (Mollusca) of the Gulf of Mexico, Pp. 579–699 in Felder, D.L. and D.K. Camp (eds.), Gulf of Mexico–Origins, Waters, and Biota. Biodiversity. Texas A&M Press, College Station, Texas. 
 Rolán E. & Fernández-Garcés R. (2010) The shouldered species of the Rissoininae (Mollusca: Rissooidea) in the Caribbean with the description of three new species. Novapex 11(4): 83-91 page(s): 85

External links
 

fischeri
Gastropods described in 1949
Molluscs of the Atlantic Ocean